The 2002 Commonwealth Games, officially known as the XVII Commonwealth Games and commonly known as Manchester 2002 were held in Manchester, England, from 25 July to 4 August 2002. The 2002 Games were to be hosted in the United Kingdom to coincide with the Golden Jubilee of Elizabeth II, head of the Commonwealth, and Manchester was selected for the 2002 Games ahead of London using a recycled part of the project, which lost the 2000 Summer Olympics and Paralympics to Sydney, Australia. The 2002 Commonwealth Games were, prior to the 2012 Summer Olympics, the largest multi-sport event ever to be held in the UK, eclipsing the London 1948 Summer Olympics in terms of teams and athletes participating. The 2002 Commonwealth Games had the largest number of events of any Commonwealth Games in history, featuring 281 events across 17 sports.

The Games were considered a success for the host city, providing an event to display how Manchester had changed following the 1996 bombing. The Games formed the main catalyst for the widespread regeneration and heavy development of Manchester, and bolstered its reputation as a European and global city internationally. Rapid economic development and continued urban regeneration of the now post-industrial Manchester continued after the Games which helped cement its place as one of the principal cultural cities in the United Kingdom.

The opening and closing ceremonies, the athletics and the rugby sevens events were held at the City of Manchester Stadium, which was purpose-built for the Games. Seventy-two associations competed in 14 individual sports and 3 team sports events.

Sporting legacy includes the British Cycling team who inherited the Manchester Velodrome and went on to win eight gold medals at the 2008 Olympics and another eight gold medals at the 2012 Olympics, partly attributed to the availability of the velodrome. The stadium was leased long-term to Manchester City F.C.  and, as a result, have since found themselves in a desirable investment opportunity in the age of foreign football investment. The club was taken over by the Abu Dhabi United Group led by Sheikh Mansour in 2008, a takeover that would have been far less certain without the stadium. The Games were a formative moment for Manchester and Britain with then-IOC president Jacques Rogge viewing the games as an important litmus test as to whether Britain could host the Summer Olympics. The success of the Games quickly encouraged some speculation of a city bid for the Olympics, but London bid for the 2012 Summer Olympics and Paralympics with London going on to win the bid on 6 July 2005 and the games were successfully staged seven years later.

Host city selection 

When England decided to bid for the 2002 Commonwealth Games, three English cities – London, Manchester and Sheffield -showed interest in hosting the Games. The Commonwealth Games Council of England (CGCE) had to choose one city to put forward to the Commonwealth Games Federation (CGF). London had hosted the 1934 Commonwealth Games as well as the 1908 and 1948 Summer Olympics, while Sheffield had hosted the 1991 Summer Universiade. Manchester had unsuccessfully bid for the 1996 and 2000 Summer Olympics, and Bob Scott, chairman of the Olympic bid committees, led the bid for another big event.

Sheffield withdrew from the bidding process when the city was unable to come to agreement over financial guarantees. This left the 24 members of the CGCE to choose between Manchester and London, with Manchester winning 17–7. Cities from no other countries submitted bids and so Manchester was announced as the host city of the 2002 Games on 6 November 1995.

Preparation and development

Venues 

The venues were eclectic ranging from high-tech architecture in the newer City of Manchester Stadium to the 19th-century Manchester Central hall. The Games' main venue was the City of Manchester Stadium (now Etihad Stadium), which hosted all athletics events, the rugby sevens and the opening and closing ceremonies. The stadium was a smaller and downscaled  version of that proposed during Manchester's bid for the 2000 Summer Olympics. Construction started in January 2000, and was completed shortly before the Games. The cost was approximately £110 million, £77 million of which was provided by Sport England, with the remainder funded by Manchester City Council. For the Commonwealth Games the stadium featured a single lower tier running around three sides of the athletics track, and second tiers to the two sides, with an open-air temporary stand at one end, giving an overall capacity of 41,000.
The stadium formed the centrepiece of an area known as Sportcity. Other venues in Sportcity include the Manchester Velodrome, which hosted cycling, and the £3.5m National Squash Centre, which was built specifically for the Games.

Swimming and diving events took place at Manchester Aquatics Centre, another purpose-built venue, and until 2012,was the only one in the United Kingdom with two 50 m pools.

The Manchester Arena built in 1994, at the time was the largest arena in Europe hosted netball finals and boxing preliminares.

The shooting events were held at the National Shooting Centre, Bisley (located in Surrey). The NSC saw major redevelopment of all its ranges in order to host the fullbore rifle, smallbore rifle, pistol and clay target events.

The Games Village was located in the residential area of the University of Manchester Fallowfield Campus -in an area of 30 acres, being built specifically for the event and after the Games the buildings were donated to the university and turned an expansion of the housing complex.

Queen's Jubilee Baton Relay 

The 2002 Queen's Jubilee Baton Relay, the continuation of a tradition that started with the 1958 Games, consisted of the relay of an electronic baton, containing a personal message from Elizabeth II across 23 Commonwealth nations. The relay culminated in the arrival of the baton at the City of Manchester Stadium, opening the Games. The speech was then removed electronically from the baton, and read by Her Majesty to open the Games.

The 2002 Baton itself was designed by a company called IDEO, and was constructed of machined aluminium with the handle plated for conductivity. It weighed 1.69 kg, reached over 710 mm, and was 42.5 mm to 85 mm in diameter. The Queen's message itself was held in an aluminium capsule inserted into the top of the Baton. On either side of the Baton were two sterling silver coins, designed by Mappin and Webb, which celebrated the City of Manchester as host of the XVII Commonwealth Games.

The Baton was also equipped with sensors that detected and monitored the Runner's pulse rate. This information was then conveyed to a series of light-emitting diodes (LEDs), via a light behaviour module. The lens then transformed the LEDs into a shaft of bright blue pulsating light which synchronised with each new Runner. The hearts of the Runner and the Baton then beat as one until it was passed on, symbolising the journey of humanity and the essence of life.

The Queen's Jubilee Baton Relay passed through over 500 cities, towns and villages across the UK and the Baton was carried by 5,000 individuals, with each Runner carrying the Baton up to 500 yards, however on Saturday 15 June, the baton was snatched from a runners hand in the town of Connah's Quay, Deeside in north Wales.

The UK Baton Runners were made up of people from all walks of life including athletes, celebrities and local heroes from all over the country. Around 2500 Jubilee Runners were nominated by the community to carry the Baton, because they made a special contribution to their community or achieved a personal goal against the odds.

The judging of the Jubilee Runners was conducted by a panel of judges under the supervision of The Duke of Edinburgh's Award in January 2002. The relay was sponsored by Cadbury Schweppes, a major UK confectionery and soft drinks manufacturer.

Budget 
The cost of hosting the 2002 Commonwealth Games was estimated at £300 million. Prior to the games, a £100 million was required to fill a financial black hole and the government agreed to provide the funding required, despite some believing that £300 million was too much.

Cultureshock and Festival Live 

Cultureshock was the Commonwealth Games Cultural Programme which ran alongside the Games themselves. The events ranged from images of the athlete as hero in sculpture and photography (Go! Freeze, which ran at Turton Tower in Bolton) to a Zulu performance at The Lowry. There was an exhibition at the Whitworth Art Gallery called Tales of Power: West African Textiles, and a performance of the film Monsoon Wedding at Clwyd Theatr Cymru. The geographical range was from Cheshire in the south to Blackburn and Cumbria in the north, and included that year the various Melas that take place around the region.

Cultureshock also ensured that a wide range of cultural events and acts reached the "man on the street", with the city centre of Manchester filled with bands, performers, and artists of various forms entertaining the thousands of visitors to the Games. It also coincided with the BBC's 2002 Festival Live series of open-air concerts and celebrations around the country, held to celebrate the Queen's Golden Jubilee. Many of the cultural events were covered by the BBC 2002 radio station covering the games.

Opening ceremony 

The Project & Artistic Director for the Opening Ceremony was David Zolkwer. Five-time Olympic champion Sir Steve Redgrave opened the two-and-a-quarter-hour opening ceremony by banging a large drum, which initiated a co-ordinated dance and fireworks act. The champion rower was joined on the stage by sporting stars including yachtswoman Ellen MacArthur, heptathlete Denise Lewis, long-distance runner Moses Kiptanui, swimmer Susie O'Neill and sprinter Donovan Bailey. The Grenadier Guards shared the arena with pop band S Club and Salford-born opera singer Russell Watson sang the Games' theme, "Faith of the Heart", while the arrival of HM The Queen was greeted with a flypast by the Red Arrows. England football captain David Beckham helped chaperone Queen's Baton final runner Kirsty Howard, assisting the terminally ill six-year-old to hand the baton to The Queen. A 4,000-strong cast took part in the £12 million spectacular, which in theme and tone consisted of a mix of "pomp and pop", combining the ceremonial aspects of the Games with a party-style atmosphere, based on Manchester's reputation as the party city of "Madchester". The ceremony was voiced by broadcaster Anthony Davis.

The traditional athletes' parade was led by previous hosts Malaysia, and England brought up the rear before The Queen as the Head of the Commonwealth, declared the Games open:

"All of us participating in this ceremony tonight, whether athletes or spectators, or those watching on television around the world, can share in the ideals of this unique association of nations,"

"We can all draw inspiration from what the Commonwealth stands for, our diversity as a source of strength, our tradition of tolerance ... our focus on young people, for they are our future."

"It is my pleasure in this my Golden Jubilee Year to declare the 17th Commonwealth Games open."

Closing ceremony 
The Project & Artistic Director for the Closing Ceremony was David Zolkwer. The Queen ended 11 days of competition at a rain-drenched closing ceremony in the City of Manchester Stadium. She declared the Games closed in front of a  sell-out crowd gathered in the stadium. She also called on the athletes to assemble again in four years in Melbourne and to continue displaying the "friendship" they had shown in Manchester. The ceremony, attended by Prime Minister Tony Blair and several other dignitaries, took place in pouring rain and like the opening ceremony, mixed "pomp with pop". Australian Ian Thorpe, the star of the Games with his six swimming golds, carried his national flag into the arena, along with athletes from each of the other competing countries. Around  balloons were released into the rainy Manchester sky as the ceremony concluded with a spectacular fireworks display.

Closing ceremony highlights included:

Children covering themselves with red, blue and white paint to portray a giant British flag before unveiling a giant portrait of The Queen as a Golden Jubilee gift.
The athletes bringing their national flags into the stadium
South African swimmer Natalie du Toit being honoured as the outstanding athlete of the Games.
The symbolic handover of the Commonwealth Games Ceremonial Flag to Melbourne, host city for the 2006 Games.
A spectacular presentation with over  lanterns, which ended with the message 'Seek Peace' lit up in vast letters on the floor of the arena.
Coronation Street stars Steve Arnold and Tracy Shaw (who played characters Ashley and Maxine Peacock) arriving in one of 40 Morris Minors which became the centre of a song-and-dance showpiece.
Hip-hop DJ Grandmaster Flash encouraging the massed ranks to "make some noise" as athletes and volunteers poured into the arena to music from the likes of Will Young, Dave Stewart, Heather Small, Jimmy Cliff and Toploader.
Australian singer Vanessa Amorosi sang her signature tune, Shine and a song about the city of Melbourne, "I'll always be a Melbourne girl" just as it began to pour with rain.

Participating teams 
There were 73 participating countries, territories and Commonwealth regions at the 2002 Commonwealth Games. The 2002 event marked the last time Zimbabwe has participated to date; Zimbabwe formally withdrew from the Commonwealth of Nations the following year.

Calendar

Sports 

There were the maximum of 17 sports included in the schedule for the 2002 Commonwealth Games.

After experimenting with it on a smaller scale at the 1994 Commonwealth Games and dropping it at the 1998 Games, disabled competitions were held in swimming, athletics, bowls, table tennis and weightlifting (powerlifting). The medals were added to the final tally for each nation.

Highlights 

 Australian Ian Thorpe set a world record in the 400-metre freestyle swimming.
 English swimmer Zoë Baker set a world record in the 50-metre breaststroke.
 English track athlete Paula Radcliffe won her first major gold medal in the 5,000 metres, to record a time of 14:31.42, over 20 seconds ahead of silver medallist Edith Masai of Kenya and 1 minute 21 seconds faster than the inaugural running of the event four years earlier.
 In the final of the 100 m for men (athletics), the two English favourites (Dwain Chambers & Mark Lewis-Francis) both pulled up with injuries. The race was won by Kim Collins of Saint Kitts and Nevis, winning the country's first Commonwealth title.
Simon Whitfield of Canada, the 2000 Olympic champion and the 2008 Olympic silver medallist, won gold in the triathlon.
 On the last day of track competition, England won gold in both the men's 4×100 and 4×400 relays by tiny margins, recording the same time (38.62) as the Jamaican quartet in sprint relay and holding off a fast finishing Welsh team by 1/100th of a second in the longer race, with a winning time of 3:00.40.
 The women's 4×400 relay was won by Australia after the favoured Jamaican team dropped the baton.
 In winning the triple jump England's Jonathan Edwards simultaneously held the World, Olympic, European and Commonwealth championships and the World record. He would lose the European title a week later in Munich.
 Another world record was set in the 4000-metre team pursuit at the track cycling by the Australian team. Scot Chris Hoy took the individual time trial and 19-year-old Nicole Cooke of Wales won the women's cycling road race.
 South African swimmer Natalie du Toit created history. As well as winning her events in the newly included disabled swimming event, the 18-year-old, missing the lower section of her left leg, made the final of the 800-metre able-bodied freestyle event in one of a small number of disabled sporting events integrated into the games.
In gymnastics England's Beth Tweddle and Kanukai Jackson took gold in the asymmetric bars and all around events respectively. Herodotos Giorgallas also won the first gymnastics gold ever for Cyprus when tying with Scotland's Steve Frew.
The host broadcaster of the games was the BBC and the International Broadcast Centre was located at the Manchester College of Arts and Technology.

Medal table

Legacy host city and nation 
In terms of infrastructure, the Games were the catalyst for the widespread redevelopment of the east of the city, an area which had remained derelict since the departure of heavy industry some decades before. The 2002 Commonwealth Games set a new benchmark for hosting the Commonwealth Games and for cities wishing to bid for them with a heavy emphasis on legacy.

The venue and financial policy of the 2002 Commonwealth Games has influenced future sporting events, including the 2006 Commonwealth Games in Melbourne, the 2012 Summer Olympics in London and 2014 Commonwealth Games in Glasgow.

In comparison to other sporting events, the 2002 games were marked by financial discipline. The cost of the 2010 Commonwealth Games were estimated at $4.1 billion, the London 2012 Summer Olympics are estimated to cost £9 billion, while the 2014 Commonwealth Games could cost as much as £500 million.

Sporting legacy included the City of Manchester Stadium which was turned over to Manchester City Football Club, to replace the ageing Maine Road. It is possible that this provided an incentive which led to the eventual 2008 take over by the Abu Dhabi United group led by Sheikh Mansour. Consequently, they have seen a considerable upturn in their success, with a series of transfers which has increased the profile of Manchester further, as Manchester City have become title challengers. Indeed, journalists have stated Mansour would not had bought the city had the club not had the 50,000 stadium. The Manchester Velodrome was built in 1994 in preparation for an Olympic bid, but subsequently hosted the 2002 Commonwealth Games. Since opening in 1994, it has been cited as a catalyst for Britain's successes in track cycling since 2002. At the 2008 Olympics in Beijing, the Great British cycling claimed 8 of the 18 gold medals on offer, including 14 of the 54 medals available altogether. This unprecedented achievement was partly attributed the availability of a velodrome.

Local communities benefited from facilities built for the game such as the Manchester Aquatics Centre, the Northern Regional Tennis Centre and the National Squash Centre. There were comprehensive upgrades of Belle Vue and Moss Side leisure centres serve their local communities.

Olympic president Jacques Rogge said the Games had gone a long way to restoring Britain's credibility in terms of hosting big sporting events. It has since been said that the success of the games was a major factor in reassuring the UK's sporting authorities and the government that the country could successfully stage major successful international sporting events and that, without them, London's successful bid for the 2012 Summer Olympics would not have come about. Public houses and restaurants in Manchester reported a threefold increase in takings during the Games, and local tourism board Marketing Manchester estimate some  more visitors will come to the city each year as a result of its increased profile. It is estimated that by 2008 £600m has been invested in the region as a result of the Games and that about 20,000 jobs had been created.

Marketing

Logo 
The 2002 Commonwealth Games' logo is an image of three figures standing on a podium with their arms uplifted in the jubilation of winning or in celebration, which represents the three core themes of the Games: sport, culture and friendship and the types of medalist in the games: gold, silver and bronze. The figures are captured in three colours which are red, blue and green. The red represents performance, passion and success; the blue symbolises intelligence, confidence and reliability, while the green represents loyalty, balance and generosity. The yellow background behind the figures represents the competitive, powerful and cheerful elements of the Games, while the black games' name letters representing solidarity and strength. The figures in the logo joining hands to resemble the letter 'M', which is the initial for the host city, Manchester and also a crown of the queen to represent the Golden Jubilee of Elizabeth II's reign as the monarch of The United Kingdom. The logo overall represents a celebration of sharing and friendship and the pride of participating in the Games, cheerful atmosphere, sportsmanship and confidence of Manchester as the games host city.

Mascot 
The official mascot of the 2002 Commonwealth Games is a cat named Kit. The adoption of the cat as the games' mascot is to represent the young, vibrant, friendly, dynamic personality of Manchester as the games' host city.

Sponsors 
Numerous companies ranging from international to local, sponsored the 2002 Games. International sponsors included Microsoft and Xerox and also companies with local links to Manchester including Guardian Media Group, PZ Cussons and United Utilities.

See also 

 Commonwealth Games celebrated in England
 1934 Commonwealth Games – London
 2022 Commonwealth Games – Birmingham
 Commonwealth Games celebrated in United Kingdom
 1958 Commonwealth Games – Cardiff (Wales)
 1970 Commonwealth Games – Edinburgh (Scotland)
 1986 Commonwealth Games – Edinburgh (Scotland)
 2014 Commonwealth Games – Glasgow (Scotland)
Commonwealth Youth Games celebrated in United Kingdom
 2000 Commonwealth Youth Games – Edinburgh (Scotland)
 Olympic Games celebrated in Great Britain
 1908 Summer Olympics – London
 1948 Summer Olympics – London
 2012 Summer Olympics – London
 Paralympic Games celebrated in Great Britain
 1984 Summer Paralympics – Stoke Mandeville
 2012 Summer Paralympics – London
 Universiade celebrated in Great Britain
 1991 Summer Universiade – Sheffield
 European Championships celebrated in Great Britain
 2018 European Championships − Glasgow

References

External links 

Official sites

 "Manchester 2002". Thecgf.com. Commonwealth Games Federation.
 "Results and Medalists—2002 Commonwealth Games". Thecgf.com. Commonwealth Games Federation.
"Official Website". M2002.thecgf.com. Manchester 2002.
Post Games Report—2002 Commonwealth Games
Executive Summary
Sport
Operations
Communications

Other sites

 Manchester 2002 at BBC Online
 Manchester 2002 at BBC Sport
 The Empire Strikes Back – 2002 Australian radio programme (with transcript) on the history and future of the "friendly games".
 Trans-urban networks of learning, mega-events and policy tourism: The case of Manchester's Commonwealth and Olympic Games projects  An account of how Manchester officials learnt from other host cities in order to bid for and host for the Games.

 
C
Commonwealth Games in the United Kingdom
Commonwealth Games
International sports competitions in Manchester
Commonwealth Games by year
2000s in Manchester
July 2002 sports events in the United Kingdom
August 2002 sports events in the United Kingdom